The River Anton is a chalk stream in Hampshire in south east England. The principal tributary of the Anton, the Pillhill Brook, joins the river at Upper Clatford.

Course
The river rises in Anton Lakes nature reserve, in north Andover, just below  King Arthur's Way, and flows through the centre of the town. It then flows in a southerly direction through the villages of Upper Clatford, Goodworth Clatford and Cottonworth before meeting the Test just below Chilbolton.
It is a chalk stream with failing quality water and supports a wide variety of wildlife.  The river is the subject of the "River Anton Enhancement Strategy", a partnership with several agencies and local organisations to improve the river.

Leisure facilities
The Anton has some very good trout fishing with frequent catches of large specimens; fly fishing is the only method allowed. The fishing rights are private.

Created as part of its Enhancement Scheme, the River Anton Way was originally a scenic  walk along the river from Charlton Lakes in the north, via the town centre to Rooksbury Mill Local Nature Reserve in the south. In 2015, proposed by the Andover Ramblers and sponsored by Test Valley Borough Council, the way was extended by  through the parishes of Upper Clatford, Goodworth Clatford, Wherwell and Chilbolton.

Watermills
There were five watermills along the river; Anton Mill, Town Mill, and Rooksbury Mill, all in Andover, along with Copthall Place Mill at Clatford and Fullerton Mill. Flour is still milled in Andover but at the electrically powered Junction Mills.

Water quality
The Environment Agency measure water quality of the river systems in England. Each is given an overall ecological status, which may be one of five levels: high, good, moderate, poor and bad. There are several components that are used to determine this, including biological status, which looks at the quantity and varieties of invertebrates, angiosperms and fish. Chemical status, which compares the concentrations of various chemicals against known safe concentrations, is rated good or fail.

Water quality of the River Anton in 2019:

References

Rivers of Hampshire
1Anton